Sander is a crater on Mercury within Caloris Basin. It has dark walls and bright patches on its floor. Unlike the rays of Bashō crater, the bright areas are not believed to be immature, but they are inherently bright. It is named after the German photographer August Sander (1876–1964).

Hollows are present within Sander.

Views

References

Impact craters on Mercury